HPE Systems Insight Manager (HPE SIM, formerly HP Systems Insight Manager or HP SIM) is a proprietary systems management tool designed to help manage HPE servers.

HPE SIM is the basis for the HPE system management tools and is part of HPE's unified infrastructure management strategy, as well as HPE Insight Control and Insight Dynamics management solutions.

Web-Based Enterprise Management were rolled into this product as of revision 5.6 with the ability to analyze the System Event Log.

External links
 HPE Systems Insight Manager Homepage

References

Systems Insight Manager
System administration